The office of Master of the Ceremonies  was established by King James VI and I. The Master's duties were to receive foreign dignitaries and present them to the monarch at court. Below is a list of known holders until the replacement of the office by the Marshal of the Diplomatic Corps in 1920.

Masters of the Ceremonies 
 1603–1627: Sir Lewes Lewkenor
 1627–1641: Sir John Finett
 1641–1686: Sir Charles Cotterell
 1686–1710: Sir Charles Lodowick Cotterell
 1710–1758: Sir Clement Cottrell
 1758–1779: Sir Charles Cottrell-Dormer
 1779–1796: Sir Clement Cottrell-Dormer
 1796–1818: Sir Stephen (or Samuel) Cottrell
 1818–1847: Sir Robert Chester
 1847–1876: Sir Edward Cust
 1876–1890: Sir Francis Seymour
 1890–1893: Sir Christopher Teesdale
 1893–1903: Sir William James Colville
 1903–1907: Sir Douglas Dawson
 1907–1920: Sir Arthur Walsh

Assistant Masters of the Ceremonies 
 1668–1672: Charles Cotterell
 1672–1686: Charles Lodowick Cotterell
 1686–1699: John Dormer
 1699–1707: Clement Cotterell
 1710–1740: John Inglis
 1740–1758: Charles Cotterell
 1758–1796: Stephen Cotterell
 1796–1818: Robert Chester
 1818–1822: Robert Chester (jnr.)
 1822–1823: William John Crosbie
 1823–1825: Henry Thomas Baucutt Mash
 1825–1845: Thomas Seymour Hyde
 1845–1847: Sir Edward Cust
 1847–1855: William Henry Cornwall
 1855–1881: Charles Bagot
 1881–1887: Augustus Savile
 1887–1901: William Chaine

Marshals of the Ceremonies
 1660: Amice Andros
 1669: Thomas Sambourne
 1673: Richard Le Bas
 1704: John Inglis (also Assistant Master from 1710)
 1740: Robert Cotterell
 1745: Charles Cotterell (also Assistant Master since 1740)
 1759: Thomas Wright
 1761: Stephen Cotterell (also Assistant Master since 1758)
 1796: Robert Chester, senior (also Assistant Master)
 1818: Robert Chester, junior (also Assistant Master)
 1822: William John Crosbie (also Assistant Master)
 1823: Henry Thomas Baucutt Mash (also Assistant Master)
 1825: Thomas Seymour Hyde (also Assistant Master)
 1845: William Henry Cornwall
 1847: Spencer Lyttelton
 1877: Augustus Savile Lumley
 1881: William Chaine
 1887: Richard Charles Moreton
 1913: Charles Hubert Montgomery

Assistant Marshals of the Ceremonies
 1699: Charles Sambourne Le Bas
 1899: Sir Robert Follett Synge (retitled Deputy Marshal in 1902)

References 

 
 

Positions within the British Royal Household